The "" (Italian for "Lombardy Region Triptych"), usually also called Trittico Lombardo, is a cycling competition which includes three cycling races held around the region of Lombardy on three consecutive days. These races are Tre Valli Varesine, Coppa Ugo Agostoni, and Coppa Bernocchi, the winner having the best overall results in these three races.

In 2020, as a consequence of COVID-19 pandemic, the three races were united into one to form the Gran Trittico Lombardo.

Winners

Winners

See also
 Ardennes classics
 Trittico di Autunno

References

Cycle races in Italy
Recurring sporting events established in 1997
1997 establishments in Italy
Men's road bicycle races
Classic cycle races